Ridgeville is an unincorporated community in Mineral County, West Virginia, United States. It lies along U.S. Routes 50 and 220 (the "Northwestern Turnpike") in the Mill Creek Valley, west of Markwood.

The Vandiver-Trout-Clause House was listed on the National Register of Historic Places in 1979.

References

Northwestern Turnpike
Unincorporated communities in Mineral County, West Virginia
Unincorporated communities in West Virginia